Gennadiy Nikolaevich Dulnev (3 May 1927, Novokubansk—11 December 2012 Saint Petersburg ) Professor, PHd. Was LITMO University elected chancellor. Professor of Computational Thermal Physics and Electrophysical Monitoring Department of ITMO. A member of Russian Academy of Natural Sciences

Occupied position of the Head of North-West RAS Scientific Council in Thermal Physics and Thermal Energy Engineering. Also, was director of Energo-Informational Center.

Professional Mountaineer. Made first ascent in 1949.

Biography

 1944—50 studied in LITMO University at Department of Engineering and Physics.
 1950—53 performed postgraduate study at Thermal Instruments Department
 1953 Got PhD in Physics
 1959 Got Docent degree
 1958 Published Thesis devoted to problem of heat exchange in machines with energy sources.
 1959 Got Doctor degree. 
 1961 Was elected professor of Heat Instruments and Measuring Devices Department.

At 1951 took a position in LITMO (now Saint Petersburg National Research University of Information Technologies, Mechanics and Optics).

 1951—60 Occupied positions of an assistant, senior lecturer and Docent
 1958—95 Became the Head of Thermal Physics Department
 1960—74 Became the Head of Computational Thermal Physics and Electrophysical Monitoring Department
 1961—62 Obtained position of Vice-Rector at Scientific Problems
 1974—86 Became Rector of ITMO
 From 1990 occupied director position of Energo-Informational Center.
 At 1995 became professor of Computational Thermal Physics and Electrophysics Monitoring Department.

Was one of the leaders of scientific school of heat and mass exchange in instrumentation area. Was widely known as a specialist in Materials Thermal Properties and Thermal Physics. Also worked on some problems of Bioinformatics.

.

Occupied chairman position of Mass and Heat Transfer in Engineering and Production Scientific Society of USSR Scientific and Engineer committee (1974–91).

Author of more than 300 scientific papers, 4 textbooks and 8 monographs.

Was Doctoral advisor for 11 Science Doctors and Scientific Supervisor for 40 PhD Students.

Awarded Order of Honour (Russia) (2000), Medal "In Commemoration of the 300th Anniversary of Saint Petersburg"(2004) and many others.

Was awarded degree of Honoured master of sciences and engineering in 1982.

List of Monographs
 G. N. Dulnev. Energy Press, Moscow, 1968.
 G. N. Dulnev, E. M. Semyashkin. Energy Press, Moscow, 1968.
 G. N. Dulnev, N. N. Tarnovski, Moscow, 1971.
 G. N. Dulnev, Yu. P. Zarichnyak, Energy Press, Moscow, 1974.
 G. N. Dulnev, textbook. High School Press, Moscow, 1984.
 G. N. Dulnev, A. P. Belyakov. Moscow, 1985.
 G. N. Dulnev, V. N. Novikov. Energy Press, Moscow, 1991.
 G. N. Dulnev, A. V. Sharkov, LITMO, Leningrad., 1984
 G. N. Dulnev, V. G. Parfenov, A. V. Sigalov. High School Press, Moscow, 1990.
 G. N. Dulnev Introduction to Synergetics. Prospect Press, Saint Peterburg, 1998.
 G. N. Dulnev Exchange of Energy and Information in Nature. / Stand-forward Scientists of ITMO Series. ITMO, Iva Press, Saint Peterburg, 2000. — 140 pages. 
 G. N. Dulnev In search of Fine Worlds. Descriptions of Scientific Experiments devoted to Human Psychic Ability. Vies Press, Saint Peterburg, 2004. — 286 pages.

References

External links
 Gennadiy Nokolaevich Dulnev // Personal Page at ITMO 
 Gennadiy Nokolaevich Dulnev // Stand-Forward Alumnus of ITMO 
 Gennadiy Nokolaevich Dulnev // Mountaineer of Saint Peterburg

1927 births
2012 deaths
Recipients of the Order of Honour (Russia)
Academic staff of ITMO University